Edmond Eugene Henri Caillaux (18 February 1896 — 22 January 1943) was a French World War I flying ace credited with five confirmed and three unconfirmed aerial victories.

Biography

Caillaux was born on 18 February 1896 in Vendôme, France. On 11 March 1915, he volunteered to serve in the military for the war's duration. After serving as a driver and an artilleryman, he transferred to an aviation unit on the Eastern Front. He entered the aviation service on 29 February 1916, trained as a pilot, and received Military Pilot's Brevet No. 4646 on 22 May 1916. He was then returned to the Eastern Front as a pilot. On 1 January 1917, he was transferred to the Western Front; on 28 April 1917, he was posted to Escadrille SPA.48. After three unconfirmed victories, he was credited with downing an Aviatik on 3 December 1917. He would continue to score until 17 June 1918, ending with five confirmed victories.

Caillaux died on 22 January 1943 in Montigny-les-Cormeilles, France.

Honors and awards
 Legion d'honneur awarded 24 December 1925
 Médaille Militaire awarded 27 July 1918
 Croix de Guerre

Endnotes

References
 Franks, Norman; Bailey, Frank (1993). Over the Front: The Complete Record of the Fighter Aces and Units of the United States and French Air Services, 1914–1918. London, UK: Grub Street Publishing. .

1896 births
1943 deaths
French World War I flying aces
People from Vendôme
Recipients of the Legion of Honour
Recipients of the Médaille militaire (France)
Recipients of the Croix de Guerre (France)